Platanoulia is a village in the municipality of Tyrnavos. Before the 1997 local government reform it was a part of the community of Dendra. The 2011 census recorded 563 inhabitants in the village.

Population
According to the 2011 census, the population of the settlement of Platanoulia was 563 people, an increase of almost 10% compared with the population of the previous census of 2001.

See also
 List of settlements in the Larissa regional unit

References

Populated places in Larissa (regional unit)
Tyrnavos